Broad Street Historic District in LaGrange, Georgia is a historic district.  It includes the 1855-built Bellevue, an "outstanding example" of a high-style Greek Revival mansion which is a National Historic Landmark.

Post American Civil War architectural styles represented in the district include "eclectic Victorian styles", turn-of-the-20th-century Neoclassical and Georgian Revival styles and early-twentieth-century Tudor Revival and Craftsman/Bungalow styles".

References

Historic districts on the National Register of Historic Places in Georgia (U.S. state)
Geography of Troup County, Georgia
National Register of Historic Places in Troup County, Georgia